"Resurrection Men" is a 2007 episode of STV's Rebus television series. It was the first episode broadcast in the show's fourth season, and starred Ken Stott in the title role. The episode was based on the Ian Rankin novel of the same name.

Plot
After a disciplinary incident Rebus is sent on a re-training course. There he falls in with McCulloch and Grey, two detectives involved in a range of corrupt practices, including the fire-bombing of a witness' home. Meanwhile Clarke is investigating the murder of an art dealer in the city. As the cases become entwined, it is revealed Rebus has been working a sting operation against McCulloch and Grey, while the witness takes a grisly revenge.

Cast 
Ken Stott as DI John Rebus
Claire Price as DS Siobhan Clarke
Des McAleer as DI Francis Grey 
Jon Morrison as DI Jack McCulloch
Jamie Michie as Danny Kerr
Stella Gonet as Cynthia Marber

Footnotes

External links 

2007 British television episodes
Rebus (TV series) episodes